Villa Maria Motherhouse Complex, or Felician Sisters Immaculate Heart of Mary Convent Chapel and Convent, is a historic Roman Catholic convent located at Cheektowaga in Erie County, New York.  It is included in the Roman Catholic Diocese of Buffalo.  It was constructed in 1927, and is a three-part Gothic Revival building that was built for the Felician Sisters of St. Francis to house a boarding and day high school, public and private chapels and the Motherhouse/Novitiate.  The school, known as Villa Maria Academy, closed in 2006. The school property was repurposed as affordable housing for seniors.

It was listed on the National Register of Historic Places in 2006.

Alumni 
 Christine Baranski, American stage and screen actress

References

External links
Felician Sisters of North America
Angela's House
Felician Sisters Immaculate Heart of Mary Convent Chapel and Convent, Buffalo as an Architectural Museum website
Villa Maria Motherhouse Complex - U.S. National Register of Historic Places on Waymarking.com
Preservation Studios Buffalo, NY: historic building rehabilitation and preservation consultants 

Properties of religious function on the National Register of Historic Places in New York (state)
Gothic Revival architecture in New York (state)
Religious buildings and structures completed in 1927
School buildings completed in 1927
Buildings and structures in Erie County, New York
National Register of Historic Places in Erie County, New York
1927 establishments in New York (state)